Sarah T. Reed High School is a high school in Eastern New Orleans in New Orleans, Louisiana.

History
Reed opened in 1988 and was directly operated by the Orleans Parish School Board and then the Recovery School District. It was named after Sarah Towles Reed and the campus was built to house up to 1,170 students.

In 2005, as Hurricane Katrina was about to hit land, the New Orleans Regional Transit Authority (RTA) designated Reed High School as a place where people could receive transportation to the Louisiana Superdome, a shelter of last resort.

After Hurricane Katrina hit New Orleans, Reed was moved to an alternate location, where it stayed until October 2006. During that month it moved to its original building, which at that time housed middle and high school classes. Sarah T. Reed closed in spring 2014. 

The Recovery School District stated that there were plans to reopen Reed in 2016; it was looking for organizations to act as charter school operators for Reed. 

In 2018, Reed High School reopened under the management of Einstein Charter Schools.

Athletics
Reed High athletics competes in the LHSAA.

References

External links

 Sarah T. Reed High School
 "Sarah T. Reed High School." Recovery School District.
 

Defunct public high schools in New Orleans
Educational institutions established in 1988
1988 establishments in Louisiana
2014 disestablishments in Louisiana
Educational institutions disestablished in 2014